Chris Steele may refer to:

 Chris Steele (musician), bass player
 Chris Steele (doctor), resident health expert on the UK TV show This Morning
 Chris Steele (American football), football player with University of Southern California
 Christopher Steele (born 1964), British private intelligence consultant and MI6 officer

See also
 Chris Steele-Perkins (born 1947), photographer
 Chris Steel, Australian politician
 Christopher Steel (diplomat) (1903–1973), British diplomat who was permanent representative to NATO and ambassador to West Germany